Anjappar Chettinad Restaurant is a privately owned Indian casual-dining restaurant chain, founded in Chennai, Tamil Nadu, India in 1964. It now operates over 30 locations in Chennai, Erode, Madurai, Coimbatore, Salem, and Bangalore. Internationally, the franchise has restaurants in Sri Lanka, Singapore, Malaysia, Hong Kong, the Middle East, Australia, and North America.

Anjappar offers South Indian cuisine, particularly focusing on producing Chettinad-style preparations, while some locations additionally offer Sri Lankan, Oriental and Middle East dishes.

References

External links
 

Restaurants established in 1964
Companies based in Chennai
Restaurant chains in India
1964 establishments in Madras State
Indian companies established in 1964